Pavel Andreyevich Rozhkov (born 31 December 1986) is a Russian former professional football player. He played as a defensive midfielder or centre back.

Club career
He made his Russian Premier League debut for FC Yenisey Krasnoyarsk on 29 July 2018 in a game against FC Zenit Saint Petersburg.

External links
 
 

1986 births
Sportspeople from Krasnoyarsk
Living people
Russian footballers
FC Luch Vladivostok players
FC Yenisey Krasnoyarsk players
FC Vityaz Podolsk players
FC Irtysh Omsk players
FC Sakhalin Yuzhno-Sakhalinsk players
Association football midfielders
Russian Premier League players